Willows is a city and the county seat of Glenn County, California, located in the Sacramento Valley region of Northern California. The city is a home to regional government offices, including the California Highway Patrol, California Department of Motor Vehicles, the United States Bureau of Reclamation and the main offices of the Mendocino National Forest, which comprises about one million acres (404,686 ha) of Federal land located mostly in mountainous terrain west of Willows. The population was 6,293 at the 2020 census.

History

The Willow post office opened in 1862; the name was changed to Willows in 1916. The current post office building, which was built in 1918, is listed on the National Register of Historic Places.
The Willows Auxiliary Field (1942-1945) was used for training World War II pilots.

Geography

Climate
Willows has a Hot-summer Mediterranean climate (Csa) according to the Köppen climate classification system.

Demographics

2010

At the 2010 census Willows had a population of 6,166. The racial makeup of Willows was 4,304 (69.8%) White, 78 (1.3%) African American, 138 (2.2%) Native American, 312 (5.1%) Asian, 11 (0.2%) Pacific Islander, 1,099 (17.8%) from other races, and 224 (3.6%) from two or more races. Hispanic or Latino of any race were 2,020 persons (32.8%).

The census reported that 5,976 people (96.9% of the population) lived in households, 20 (0.3%) lived in non-institutionalized group quarters, and 170 (2.8%) were institutionalized.

There were 2,173 households, 839 (38.6%) had children under the age of 18 living in them, 1,037 (47.7%) were opposite-sex married couples living together, 327 (15.0%) had a female householder with no husband present, 133 (6.1%) had a male householder with no wife present.  There were 225 (10.4%) unmarried opposite-sex partnerships, and 7 (0.3%) same-sex married couples or partnerships. 538 households (24.8%) were one person and 228 (10.5%) had someone living alone who was 65 or older. The average household size was 2.75.  There were 1,497 families (68.9% of households); the average family size was 3.28.

The age distribution was 1,783 people (28.9%) under the age of 18, 614 people (10.0%) aged 18 to 24, 1,542 people (25.0%) aged 25 to 44, 1,445 people (23.4%) aged 45 to 64, and 782 people (12.7%) who were 65 or older.  The median age was 32.6 years. For every 100 females, there were 97.4 males.  For every 100 females age 18 and over, there were 94.5 males.

There were 2,399 housing units at an average density of ,of which 2,173 were occupied, 1,148 (52.8%) by the owners and 1,025 (47.2%) by renters.  The homeowner vacancy rate was 2.3%; the rental vacancy rate was 8.8%.  3,137 people (50.9% of the population) lived in owner-occupied housing units and 2,839 people (46.0%) lived in rental housing units.

2000
At the 2000 census there were 6,220 people in 2,134 households, including 1,513 families, in the city. The racial makeup of the city was 69.3% White, 0.9% Black or African American, 2.3% Native American, 10.3% Asian, 0.2% Pacific Islander, 12.3% from other races, and 4.8% from two or more races.  23.3% of the population were Hispanic or Latino of any race.
Of the 2,134 households 38.5% had children under the age of 18 living with them, 52.1% were married couples living together, 14.2% had a female householder with no husband present, and 29.1% were non-families. 24.7% of households were one person and 11.0% were one person aged 65 or older.  The average household size was 2.83 and the average family size was 3.40.

The age distribution was 32.7% under the age of 18, 9.6% from 18 to 24, 26.4% from 25 to 44, 19.0% from 45 to 64, and 12.4% 65 or older.  The median age was 31 years. For every 100 females, there were 98.1 males.  For every 100 females age 18 and over, there were 92.4 males.

The median income for a household in the city was $27,466, and the median family income  was $35,856. Males had a median income of $30,297 versus $22,159 for females. The per capita income for the city was $12,523.  About 17.7% of families and 24.6% of the population were below the poverty line, including 39.6% of those under age 18 and 9.4% of those age 65 or over.

Politics

Notable people
Ace Adams, born in Willows, former major league baseball All-Star
Mark Koenig, baseball player for championship New York Yankees teams, died in Willows

References

External links

 

 
Cities in Glenn County, California
County seats in California
Incorporated cities and towns in California
1886 establishments in California
Populated places established in 1886